Lepidozia pearsonii is a species of liverwort belonging to the family Lepidoziaceae.

Variety:
 Lepidozia pearsonii var. lacerata (Stephani) Pocs

References

Lepidoziaceae